Roger Bamber (31 August 1944 - 11 September 2022) was a British photojournalist whose subjects included war, politics and music for both broadsheet and tabloid newspapers. He won both the British Press Photographer of the Year and News Photographer of the Year twice and was described as “a picture editor’s dream.”

Early life and education 
Roger Bamber was born in Leicester on 31 August 1944 to Vera (nee Stephenson) and Fred Bamber. He had an older sister Valerie. His mother had a job in the local textile industry and his father was a telephone operator. He grew up near the Great Central Railway line which created a lifelong interest in steam trains.

Bamber left Beaumont Leys secondary school in 1960 aged 16, without any O levels. His first camera was a Kodak Brownie. He enrolled in a graphic art class at Leicester College of Art and spent £80, his entire year’s student grant, on a Nikon camera. He graduated in 1963, and joined Fleetway Publications, a local advertising agency as a junior photographer. In 1964, Leicester College of Art started its first photography course. Bamber was asked to teach on it.

Career 
In 1965, Bamber sought work as a photographer in London. He was offered his first Fleet Street role by the Daily Mail on his first day of job hunting, covering news as well as features for the then broadsheet newspaper. In 1967 he was honored as "commercial and industrial photographer of the year" in the British Press Awards for his work at the Mail.

In November 1969, he moved to the newly launched tabloid The Sun, and worked for the publication for the next 19 years covering hard news and softer features. He travelled the globe, recording armed conflicts to royalty and pop and rock stars.

In 1973 he won another photographer of the year award for a photograph of the immediate aftermath of the IRA bombing at the Old Bailey law courts in London.

In 1976 the Rolling Stones gave him permission to photograph their first night of rehearsals at the Festhalle, Frankfurt, during their European tour. The agreement was recorded in a handwritten note on hotel letterhead. Bamber’s 1985 photograph of Freddie Mercury performing at Live Aid became an iconic image of the singer.

By 1988, Bamber had moved to  work as a freelance photographer for The Observer, followed by The Guardian shortly thereafter. In 1992, he won a photographer of the year award from the Guardian.

Bamber's images were part of the successful bid made by Brighton and Hove to gain city status in 1999.

In 2009, Bamber retired from mainstream newspaper photography but continued to photograph a wide variety of subjects which interested him. He was working on the proofs of a book, Out of the Ordinary until shortly before his death.

Awards and recognition 
1967 Daily Mail, commercial and industrial photographer of the year 

1973 Photographer of the Year 

1992 The Guardian, Photographer of the Year

2005 University of Brighton, honorary master’s degree “for his distinguished photojournalism and the wealth of images of Brighton inspired by the city”.

Personal life 
In 1982, Bamber met Shân Lancaster, a journalist, while they were both covering the Falklands conflict for the Sun newspaper. They were married in 2004 after being together for 40 years. Bamber settled in Brighton in 1973.

Roger Bamber died of lung cancer at the Royal Sussex County Hospital in Brighton on 11 September 2022.

References 

1944 births
2022 deaths
British photographers
People from Leicester